Dinner With The Band is an American food reality show hosted by chef Sam Mason. It began as an ON Networks web series in March 2007 but was later acquired by the Independent Film Channel and premiered as a full-length 30-min television show on November 24, 2009.

The premise
In each episode, Mason invites a band into a Brooklyn loft doubling as a kitchen/small concert studio space. The band joins him in the kitchen as he creates an original meal in their honor such as Sharon Steaks and The Dap Rings for Sharon Jones & The Dap-Kings or Les Savy Pheasant for Les Savy Fav. In addition to the meal, Mason also prepares cocktails inspired by the band during the show. Typically, the featured band will perform two songs in between kitchen sessions and banter with Mason about their music and experience with food throughout the show.

The host
Sam Mason is a Brooklyn-based chef who attended culinary school at Johnson & Wales University. Before becoming the host of Dinner With The Band, Mason worked under such famous chefs as Wylie Dufresne and Jean Louis Palladin. He has appeared in an episode of Iron Chef America, losing in a skirt steak battle against Iron Chef Masaharu Morimoto. His latest restaurant gig before Dinner With The Band was as chef/owner at Tailor in New York City, a position he left in late 2009.

Mason does not play an instrument himself though he has moonlighted as a country music DJ for East Village Radio. In an interview with The New York Times, Mason said that he was originally asked by the show's creators (Darin and Greg Bresnitz) to host despite the fact that they didn't know who he was. "No joke: they Googled ‘tattooed hipster chef’, and I came up."

Guest bands
 Sharon Jones & The Dap-Kings
 Les Savy Fav
 Rufus Wainwright
 MEN
 The Mountain Goats
 YACHT
 Kid Sister and Flosstradamus
 The Devil Makes Three
 The Murder City Devils
 VEGA
 My Brightest Diamond
 Au Revoir Simone
 Andrew WK
 Lightspeed Champion
 Final Fantasy

References

External links 
 
 
 Trailer for Season Two posted by Pop Tarts Suck Toasted
 Sam Mason interview with Food & Wine Magazine 
 Music Mix playlist by Sam Mason for Entertainment Weekly

2009 American television series debuts
2010s American reality television series
IFC (American TV channel) original programming